In analytical chemistry, a standard solution is a solution containing a precisely known concentration of an element or a substance. A known mass of solute is dissolved to make a specific volume. It is prepared using a standard substance, such as a primary standard. Standard solutions (called titrants or titrators) are used to determine the concentrations of other substances, such as solutions in titration. The concentrations of standard solutions are normally expressed in units of moles per litre (mol/L, often abbreviated to M for molarity), moles per cubic decimetre (mol/dm3), kilomoles per cubic metre (kmol/m3) or in terms related to those used in particular titrations (such as titres). A simple standard is obtained by the dilution of a single element or a substance in a soluble solvent with which it reacts.
A primary standard is a reagent that is extremely pure, stable, has no waters of hydration, and has high molecular weight. Some primary standards of titration of acids include sodium carbonate.

Uses
A known volume of a solution of acid can be standardized by titrating it against a solution of alkali of known concentration. Standard solutions are also commonly used to determine the concentration of an analyte species. By comparing the absorbance of the sample solution at a specific wavelength to a series of standard solutions at differing known as concentrations of the analyse species, the concentration of the sample solution can be found via Beer's Law. Any form of spectroscopy can be used in this way so long as the analyte species has substantial absorbance in the spectra. The standard solution is a reference guide to discover the molarity of unknown species. Titration methods can be used to acquire the concentration of a standard solution. These involve using equipment such as a burette.

Properties
The properties of a standard solution for titrations are:
 Its concentration must remain constant all the time. This is so that there is no need for restandardization. 
 Its reaction with the analyte must be rapid in order to minimize the waiting period after addition of each reagent.
 Its reaction must be reasonably complete.
 It should be possible to describe the reaction by a balanced chemical reaction.
 A method must exist for detecting the equilibrium point.

References
 

 Analytical chemistry